Stephen Clissold (17 February 1825 – 26 May 1898) was an English cricketer. He played eight first-class matches for Cambridge University Cricket Club between 1844 and 1848.

See also
 List of Cambridge University Cricket Club players

References

External links
 

1825 births
1898 deaths
English cricketers
Cambridge University cricketers
Cricketers from Greater London
Marylebone Cricket Club cricketers